"Cars" is the debut solo single by English musician Gary Numan. It was released on 21 August 1979 and is from his debut studio album, The Pleasure Principle. The song reached the top of the charts in several countries and was considered one of the first big new wave hits.  Today, Numan is considered as an early pioneer of the genre.  

The song was the first release credited solely to Gary Numan after he dropped the band name Tubeway Army, under which he had released four singles and two LPs, including the number one UK hit "Are 'Friends' Electric?", and its parent album, Replicas. Musically, the new song was somewhat lighter and more pop-oriented than its predecessors, Numan later conceding that he had chart success in mind: "This was the first time I had written a song with the intention of 'maybe it could be a hit single'; I was writing this before 'Are "Friends" Electric?' happened." He has since described "Cars" as "a pretty average song".

In the UK charts, it reached number 1 in 1979, and in 1980 hit number 1 in Canada two weeks running on the RPM national singles chart (29 weeks in the top 100). It was his only single to chart there. It rose to #4 on the US Cash Box Top 100 and #9 on the US Billboard Hot 100. Though Numan had a string of hits in the UK, "Cars" was his only song in the American Pop charts.

Composition
"Cars" is based on two musical sections: a verse/instrumental break and a bridge. The recording features a conventional rock rhythm section of bass guitar and drums, although the rest of the instruments used are analogue synthesisers, principally the Minimoog (augmenting the song's recognisable bass riff) and the Polymoog keyboard, providing austere synthetic string lines over the bass riff. The bridge section also includes a tambourine part. Numan's vocal part is sung in an almost expressionless, synthesized style. There is no "chorus" as such. The song becomes instrumental from the 1:30-point until its conclusion.

According to Numan, the song's lyrics were inspired by an incident of road rage:

Music video
The music video featured Numan's then-current backing band, including Billy Currie from the band Ultravox, though he had not actually played on the recording of "Cars". It is perhaps notable that the video for "Cars" depicts no images of actual cars. At 2:43 in the video, five Gary Numans appear to be "driving" (in a standing position, holding an imaginary steering wheel) along a Polymoog keyboard.

Release
The original UK single was released in August 1979, backed with a non-album instrumental track called "Asylum". The US B-side was "Metal", from The Pleasure Principle album. The track has been a UK Top 20 hit for Numan in 3 successive decades: on its original release in 1979 (reaching number 1), in 1987 as the 'E Reg Model' remix (reaching number 16), and finally in 1996 following its use in an advertisement for Carling Premier beer (reaching number 17). Numan has regularly performed the song onstage since its original release and it appears on all but one of his official live albums to date.

Track listing
 "Cars" (Numan) – 3:44
 "Asylum" (Numan) – 2:30

US version
 "Cars" – 3:57
 "Metal" (Numan) – 3:31

Personnel
 Gary Numan – vocals, production, keyboards (Minimoog, Polymoog), synthetic percussion
 Paul Gardiner – bass guitar
 Chris Payne – keyboards (Minimoog, Polymoog)
 Cedric Sharpley – drums, tambourine

Chart performance

Weekly singles charts

1Cars (E Reg Model) / Are 'Friends' Electric ? (Re-mix)
2Cars (2nd remix)

Year-end charts

Live versions and remixes
A selected list of Numan's official live recordings and remixes.
 Living Ornaments '79 (1981) – live recording
 White Noise (1985) – live recording also released on The Live EP
 "Cars (E Reg Model)" (1987) – remix released as a 7"/12" single (including two other 1987 mixes) and on compilation album Exhibition
 Ghost (1987) – live recording
 The Peel Sessions Volume 2 (1987) – an EP containing a 1979 live in-studio recording for John Peel's BBC Radio 1 show
 The Skin Mechanic (1989) – live recording
 "Cars ('93 Sprint)" (1993) – remix released on an EP including two 1987 mixes and three other 1993 mixes, and on compilation album The Best of Gary Numan 1978–1983
 Dream Corrosion (1994) – live recording
 "Cars (Premier Mix)" (1996) – reissued/rebadged 1987 remix released as a single and on compilation album The Premier Hits
 Living Ornaments '81 (1998) – live recording
 The Mix (1998) – three remixes ("Spahn Ranch mix", "Talla 2xlc mix" and "JLAB mix")
 Scarred (2002) – live recording
 Hybrid (2003) – remix
 Live at Shepherd's Bush Empire (2004) – live recording
 Living Ornaments '80 (2005) – reissued/expanded live recording originally released minus "Cars" in 1981

Numan performed "Cars" using a set of two dozen automobiles and their horns in an innovative 2010 commercial for DieHard. All of the cars were powered from one single battery. James Frost of Zoo Films directed the video, and Synn Labs, which had previously worked with the band OK Go, engineered the cars.

Fear Factory version

Fear Factory, an American heavy metal band, recorded a version of "Cars" and released it as the second single from their third studio album, Obsolete. The song was only included as a bonus track on the limited edition digipak re-release of Obsolete and would be instrumental in breaking Fear Factory into the mainstream. In their rendition, Gary Numan performs a duet with frontman Burton C. Bell.

Background and recording
According to Bell, around 1996, the band started performing "Cars" as an encore at European concerts. Word spread that Fear Factory was performing the song and as a result Gary Numan's manager contacted them. Upon request, Numan's management flew him out to the Vancouver studio for a three-day span to record vocals on "Cars." The band also asked Numan to record a spoken word piece for the introduction of Obsolete.

Numan had a long-standing dislike for being associated with what he perceived as dated music, and this initially made him apprehensive of working with Fear Factory until realizing "there was a chance that it could introduce me to a new generation of people who didn't know my history. And that can be useful, because my music's got a lot heavier and darker anyway." The result would be satisfactory for both parties, and Numan praised the band as "brilliant, really easy to work with. They didn't have a bad word to say about anyone."

The uncharacteristically bouncy and bright rendition somewhat contrasts with Fear Factory's reputation for intense, grinding metal, while the heavy use of synthesizer and other electronic elements corresponds with the band's industrial style. Drummer Raymond Herrera described the cover as "basically like a blueprint of a futuristic car." He added that, while other songs were considered, the band chose "Cars" because all the band members knew and appreciated it and because the keyboards suited Fear Factory's sound. Herrera later noted that the group initially wanted to record U2's "New Year's Day" but chose "Cars" because they were fortunate enough to have Numan participate. Fear Factory would later cover a different U2 song, "I Will Follow," in 2005.

Reception
"Cars" played a significant part in Obsoletes status as Fear Factory's highest-selling album. By 2001, it had sold over 750,000 copies. According to Herrera, the cover received greater enthusiasm in the UK than in the band's native US, which was validated by its chart status. During the song's promotion, Gary Numan joined the band for a concert performance in Brixton, London to much enthusiasm.

After the radio trade publication R&R listed "Cars" as the most added track on both active rock and mainstream rock in May 1999, the song earned "Breaker" status and continued to surge up the chart. "Cars" debuted and peaked at number 57 in the UK Singles Chart on 9 October.

It peaked at No. 16 on the Billboard Mainstream Rock chart and No. 38 on Modern Rock Tracks.

The song was featured as the main theme for Test Drive 6, a video game released in 1999 for the PlayStation and Dreamcast consoles.

Music video
Numan also appears in the sci-fi music video, directed by John S. Bartley and filmed in Vancouver, which debuted in June 1999. Bell enthusiastically described the ambitious video as having a "Stanley Kubrick-type of vibe to it":

Track listing
 "Cars" (remix) – 3:39
 "Descent" (Falling Deeper Mix) – 4:38
 "Edgecrusher" (Urban Assault Mix) – 4:33

Charts

Other covers, live performances and samples
In 1980, Frank Zappa played "Cars" during some live shows, but sang the lyrics to his song "In France" instead of the original ones. When "In France" was released on his 1984 album Them or Us, it got its own blues background instead. The Barron Knights used the melody and background music to "Cars" in "We Know Who Done It", their 1980 parody and spoof of "Who shot J.R.?".

Kool G. Rap & DJ Polo released their own hip hop version of "Cars" on their debut Road to the Riches album in 1989. "Cars" was covered by the Judybats on the 1991 single "Daylight" and by Shampoo on the "Girl Power" single in 1995. Dave Clarke performed the song on the Random tribute album in 1997. Nine Inch Nails performed "Cars" several times during their Wave Goodbye Tour in 2009, featuring Numan on vocals.

On 21 December 1999, during a performance of "Let It Snow! Let It Snow! Let It Snow!" on The Tonight Show with Jay Leno, the group Luscious Jackson segued into a variation on "Cars" entitled "Sleds", using the same music but changing the lyrics to describe winter activities.

In 2009, Chicane sampled "Cars" in "Hiding All the Stars" which reached No. 42 in the UK and No. 23 in Belgium.

The song "New Car" by Cledus T. Judd used the instrumental portion of "Cars" after each chorus, partially performed with car horns. The song was remixed with "Technologic" by Daft Punk and with "Here Comes My DJ" by Grandmaster Flash to be featured as a playable track in DJ Hero. Toronto-based alternative rock quartet Sloan performed a version of the song in June 2011 for The A.V. Club A.V. Undercover series.

The 2000 song "Koochy" by Armand van Helden relies heavily on the Cars melody.

References

Bibliography
 Paul Goodwin (2004). Electric Pioneer: An Armchair Guide to Gary Numan

1979 debut singles
1980 singles
Fear Factory songs
Gary Numan songs
Songs about cars
Songs written by Gary Numan
RPM Top Singles number-one singles
UK Singles Chart number-one singles
1979 songs
Beggars Banquet Records singles
Roadrunner Records singles